SpaceX manufactures launch vehicles to operate its launch provider services and to execute its various exploration goals. SpaceX currently manufactures and operates the Falcon 9 Full Thrust family of medium-lift launch vehicles and the Falcon Heavy family of heavy-lift launch vehicles – both of which powered by SpaceX Merlin engines and employing VTVL technologies to reuse the first stage. As of 2020, the company is also developing the fully reusable Starship launch system, which will replace the Falcon 9 and Falcon Heavy.

SpaceX's first launch vehicle, the Falcon 1, was the first privately developed liquid fuel launch vehicle to be launched into orbit, and utilized SpaceX's Merlin and Kestrel engines for its first and second stages, respectively. It was launched five times from Omelek Island between 2006 and 2009 – the Falcon 1e and Falcon 5 variants were planned but never developed. The Falcon 9 v1.0, utilizing upgraded Merlin engines on both its stages, was developed as part of the United States Air Force's Evolved Expendable Launch Vehicle program and NASA's Commercial Orbital Transportation Services program. It was first launched from Cape Canaveral in 2010 and later replaced by the Falcon 9 v1.1 series in 2013, which was also launched from Vandenberg. The Falcon 9 Full Thrust and Falcon Heavy variants followed in 2015 and 2018, and are both launched from Kennedy, in addition to Cape Canaveral and Vandenberg.

Nomenclature 
Elon Musk, CEO of SpaceX, has stated that the Falcon 1, 9, and Heavy are named after the Millennium Falcon from the Star Wars film series.

Current launch vehicles

Falcon Heavy 

Falcon Heavy (FH) is a super heavy lift space launch vehicle designed and manufactured by SpaceX. The Falcon Heavy is a variant of the Falcon 9 launch vehicle comprising three Falcon 9 first stages: a reinforced center core, and two additional side boosters. All three boosters are designed to be recovered and reused, although expendable flights are possible to increase the payload capacity. The side boosters assigned to Falcon Heavy's first flight were recovered from two prior Falcon 9 missions. SpaceX successfully launched the Falcon Heavy on February 6, 2018, delivering a payload comprising Musk's personal Tesla Roadster onto a trajectory reaching the orbit of Mars.

Falcon 9 "Full Thrust" 

The "Full Thrust" version of Falcon 9 is an upgraded version of the Falcon 9 v1.1. It was used the first time on 22 December 2015 for the ORBCOMM-2 launch at Cape Canaveral SLC-40 launch pad.

The first stage was upgraded with a larger liquid oxygen tank, loaded with subcooled propellants to allow a greater mass of fuel in the same tank volume. The second stage was also extended for greater fuel tank capacity. These upgrades brought a 33% increase to the previous rocket performance. Five sub-variants have been flown; only Falcon 9 Block 5 is still active.

By default the first stage lands and gets reused, although it can be expended to increase the payload capacity.

In development

Starship

Retired

Falcon 1 

The Falcon 1 is a small, partially reusable rocket capable of placing several hundred kilograms into low earth orbit. It also functioned as a testbed for developing concepts and components for the larger Falcon 9. Initial Falcon 1 flights were launched from the US government's Reagan Test Site on the island atoll of Kwajalein in the Pacific Ocean, and represented the first attempt to fly a ground-launched rocket to orbit from that site.

On 26 March 2006, the Falcon 1's maiden flight failed only seconds after leaving the pad due to a fuel line rupture. After a year, the second flight was launched on 22 March 2007 and it also ended in failure, due to a spin stabilization problem that automatically caused sensors to turn off the Merlin 2nd-stage engine. The third Falcon 1 flight used a new regenerative cooling system for the first-stage Merlin engine, and the engine development was responsible for the almost 17-month flight delay. The new cooling system turned out to be the major reason the mission failed; because the first stage rammed into the second-stage engine bell at staging, due to excess thrust provided by residual propellant left over from the higher-propellant-capacity cooling system. On 28 September 2008, the Falcon 1 succeeded in reaching orbit on its fourth attempt, becoming the first privately funded, liquid-fueled rocket to do so. The Falcon 1 carried its first and only successful commercial payload into orbit on 13 July 2009, on its fifth launch. No launch attempts of the Falcon 1 have been made since 2009, and SpaceX is no longer taking launch reservations for the Falcon 1 in order to concentrate company resources on its larger Falcon 9 launch vehicle and other development projects.

Falcon 9 v1.0 

The first version of the Falcon 9 launch vehicle, Falcon 9 v1.0, was developed in 2005–2010, and was launched for the first time in 2010. Falcon 9 v1.0 made five flights in 2010–2013, when it was retired.

Falcon 9 v1.1 

On 8 September 2005, SpaceX announced the development of the Falcon 9 rocket, which has nine Merlin engines in its first stage. The design is an EELV-class vehicle, intended to compete with the Delta IV and the Atlas V, along with launchers of other nations as well. Both stages were designed for reuse. A similarly designed Falcon 5 rocket was also envisioned to fit between the Falcon 1 and Falcon 9, but development was dropped to concentrate on the Falcon 9.

The first version of the Falcon 9, Falcon 9 v1.0, was developed in 2005–2010, and flew five orbital missions in 2010–2013. The second version of the launch system—Falcon 9 v1.1— has been retired meanwhile.

Falcon 9 v1.1 was developed in 2010–2013, and made its maiden flight in September 2013. The Falcon 9 v1.1 is a 60 percent heavier rocket with 60 percent more thrust than the v1.0 version of the Falcon 9. It includes realigned first-stage engines and 60 percent longer fuel tanks, making it more susceptible to bending during flight. The engines themselves have been upgraded to the more powerful Merlin 1D.

The stage separation system has been redesigned and reduces the number of attachment points from twelve to three, and the vehicle has upgraded avionics and software as well.

The new first stage was also supposed be used as side boosters on the Falcon Heavy launch vehicle.

The company purchased the McGregor, Texas, testing facilities of defunct Beal Aerospace, where it refitted the largest test stand at the facilities for Falcon 9 testing.

The first Falcon 9 vehicle was integrated at Cape Canaveral on 30 December 2008. NASA was planning for a flight to take place in January 2010; however the maiden flight was postponed several times and took place on 4 June 2010. At 2:50pm EST (14:50 ET), the Falcon 9 rocket successfully reached orbit.

The second flight for the Falcon 9 vehicle was the COTS Demo Flight 1, the first launch under the NASA Commercial Orbital Transportation Services (COTS) contract designed to provide "seed money" for development of new boosters. The original NASA contract called for the COTS Demo Flight 1 to occur the second quarter of 2008; this flight was delayed several times, occurring at 15:43 GMT on 8 December 2010. The rocket successfully deployed an operational Dragon spacecraft at 15:53 GMT. Dragon orbited the Earth twice, and then made a controlled reentry burn that put it on target for a splashdown in the Pacific Ocean off the coast of Mexico. The first flight of the Falcon 9 v1.1 was September 29, 2013 from Vandenberg Air Force Base carrying several payloads including Canada's CASSIOPE technology demonstration satellite. The Falcon 9 v1.1 features stretched first and second stages, and a new octagonal arrangement of the 9 Merlin-1D engines on the first stage (replacing the square pattern of engines in v1.0). SpaceX notes that the Falcon 9 v1.1 is cheaper to manufacture, and longer than v1.0. It also has a larger payload capacity: 13,150 kilograms to low Earth orbit or 4,850 kg to geosynchronous transfer orbit.

Grasshopper 

Grasshopper was an experimental technology-demonstrator, suborbital reusable launch vehicle (RLV), a vertical takeoff, vertical landing (VTVL) rocket. The first VTVL flight test vehicle—Grasshopper, built on a Falcon 9 v1.0 first-stage tank—made a total of eight test flights between September 2012 and October 2013.  All eight flights were from the McGregor, Texas, test facility.

Grasshopper began flight testing in September 2012 with a brief, three-second hop. A third flight occurred in December 2012 of 29 seconds duration, with extended hover under rocket engine power, in which it ascended to an altitude of  before descending under rocket power to come to a successful vertical landing. Grasshopper made its eighth and final test flight on October 7, 2013, flying to an altitude of  before making its eighth successful vertical landing. The Grasshopper test vehicle is now retired.

Cancelled

Falcon 1e 
The Falcon 1e was a proposed upgrade of the SpaceX Falcon 1. The Falcon 1e would have featured a larger first stage with a higher thrust engine, an upgraded second stage engine, a larger payload fairing, and was intended to be partially reusable. Its first launch was planned for mid-2011, but the Falcon 1 and Falcon 1e were withdrawn from the market, with SpaceX citing "limited demand," before its debut.
Payloads that would have flown on the Falcon 1 were instead to be flown on the Falcon 9 using excess capacity.

The first stage burn time was around 169 seconds. The restartable Kestrel 2 could burn for up to a total of 418 seconds.

The Falcon 1e planned to use Aluminum Lithium alloy 2195 in the second stage, a change from the 2014 Aluminum used in the Falcon 1 second stages.

Falcon 1e launches were intended to occur from Omelek Island, part of Kwajalein Atoll in the Marshall Islands, and from Cape Canaveral, however SpaceX had announced that they would consider other locations as long as there is a "business case for establishing the requested launch site". Following a demonstration flight, the Falcon 1e was intended to make a series of launches carrying Orbcomm O2G spacecraft, with a total of eighteen satellites being launched, several per rocket. EADS Astrium had been responsible for marketing the Falcon 1e in Europe.

Falcon 5 

The Falcon 5 was a proposed two-stage-to-orbit partially reusable launch vehicle designed by SpaceX.

The first stage of Falcon 5 was to be powered by five Merlin engines, and the upper stage by one Merlin engine, both burning RP-1 with a liquid oxygen oxidizer. Along with the Falcon 9, it would have been the world's only launch vehicle with its first stage designed for reuse.

The Falcon 5 would have been the first American rocket since the Saturn V to have full engine-out capability, meaning that with the loss of one engine, it can still meet mission requirements by burning the other four engines longer to achieve the correct orbit. In comparison, the Space Shuttle only had partial engine-out capability, meaning that it was not able to achieve proper orbit by burning the remaining engines longer.

In 2006, SpaceX stated that the Falcon 5 was a Falcon 9 with four engines removed. Since the launchers were being co-developed, work on the Falcon 9 was also applicable to the Falcon 5.

Falcon 9 Air 
Falcon 9 Air would have been an air-launched multi-stage launch vehicle under development by SpaceX in 2011–2012.  Falcon 9 Air was to be carried to launch position and launch altitude by a Stratolaunch Systems carrier aircraft, the world's largest aircraft by wingspan.  Payload to low Earth orbit was projected to be .

Propulsion for the rocket was planned to be provided by four Merlin 1D rocket engines, engines that were also to be used in the Falcon 9 v1.1 beginning in 2013, and also on the Falcon Heavy in 2014.  First flight for the air-launched Falcon 9 Air rocket was notionally planned for 2016.

In December 2011 Stratolaunch Systems announced that it would contract with SpaceX to develop an air-launched, multiple-stage launch vehicle, as a derivative of Falcon 9 technology, called the Falcon 9 Air,
as part of the Stratolaunch project.
As initially conceived with the SpaceX Falcon 9 Air (F9A) launch vehicle, Stratolaunch was to initially place satellites of up to  into low Earth orbit; and once established as a reliable system, announced that it would explore a human-rated version.

A month after the initial announcement, Stratolaunch confirmed that the first stage of the F9A launch vehicle would have only four engines, not the five that were shown in the mission video in December, and that they would be SpaceX Merlin 1D engines.

As initially announced, Stratolaunch Systems was a collaborative project that included subcontractors SpaceX, Scaled Composites, and Dynetics, with funding provided by Microsoft co-founder Paul G. Allen's Vulcan investment and project management company.
Stratolaunch set out to build a mobile launch system with three primary components: a carrier aircraft (aircraft concept was designed by Burt Rutan, but the aircraft will be designed and built by Scaled Composites); a multi-stage launch vehicle to be developed and built by SpaceX; and a mating and integration system — allowing the carrier aircraft to safely carry and release the booster — to be built by Dynetics, a Huntsville, Alabama-based engineering company.  The whole system will be the largest aircraft ever built; with the first test flight of the carrier aircraft originally expected in 2015 from Scaled Composites' facilities in Mojave, California, while the first test launch of the rocket was not expected before 2016 at the time of the project getting underway.

As the Stratolaunch development program progressed, it became clear that Stratolaunch and the system integrator, Dynetics, wanted modifications to the SpaceX basic launch-vehicle design that SpaceX felt were not strategic to the direction they were growing the company.  These included requested modifications to the launch vehicle to add chines.

Development ceased in the fourth quarter of 2012, as SpaceX and Stratolaunch "amicably agreed to end [their] contractual relationship because the [Stratolaunch] launch vehicle design [had] departed significantly from the Falcon derivative vehicle envisioned by SpaceX and does not fit well with [SpaceX's] long-term strategic business model".

On 27 November 2012 Stratolaunch announced that they would partner with Orbital Sciences Corporation—initially on an air-launched vehicle study contract—instead of SpaceX, effectively ending development of the Falcon 9 Air.

In May 2013, the Falcon 9 Air was eventually replaced in the development plan by the Orbital Sciences Pegasus II air-launched rocket.

Competitive position 

SpaceX Falcon rockets are being offered to the launch industry at highly competitive prices, allowing SpaceX to build up a large manifest of over 50 launches by late 2013, with two-thirds of them for commercial customers exclusive of US government flights.

In the US launch industry, SpaceX prices its product offerings well below its competition. Nevertheless, "somewhat incongruously, its primary US competitor, United Launch Alliance (ULA), still maintained (in early 2013) that it requires a large annual subsidy, which neither SpaceX nor Orbital Sciences receives, in order to remain financially viable, with the reason cited as a lack of market opportunity, a stance which seems to be in conflict with the market itself."

SpaceX launched its first satellite to geostationary orbit in December 2013 (SES-8) and followed that a month later with its second, Thaicom 6, beginning to offer competition to the European and Russian launch providers that had been the major players in the commercial communications satellite market in recent years.

SpaceX prices undercut its major competitors—the Ariane 5 and Proton—in this market.

Moreover, SpaceX prices for Falcon 9 and Falcon Heavy are much lower than the projected prices for Ariane 6, projected to be available in 2020, respectively.

ULA prices to the US government are nearly $400 million for current launches of Falcon 9- and Falcon Heavy-class payloads.

Comparison 

 Post 2008. Merlin 1A was used from 2006 until 2007.

See also 

 List of Falcon 9 and Falcon Heavy launches

Notes

References

External links 

 Falcon 9 overview on SpaceX company website
 Falcon Heavy overview on SpaceX company website 

 
Space launch vehicles of the United States